The Battle of Valutino took place on 19 August 1812, between a corps of French and allied troops led by Marshal Ney, about 35,000 strong, and a strong rear-guard of General Barclay de Tolly's Russian army of about 25,000,  commanded by the general himself. The Russians were strongly posted in marshy ground, protected by a small stream, about 20 kilometers east of Smolensk. The French, attacking resolutely, captured the Russian position in the face of considerable physical obstacles.

Prelude
Napoleon's hopes of trapping General Barclay's army were dashed when he discovered that the Russian force awaiting the French was a rearguard under General Tuchkov. Barclay's main force of three infantry and one cavalry corps was strung out near Smolensk, trying to get away from the French after the Battle of Smolensk. The rearguard then turned around to fight the French on the Stragan river.

Battle
After a heavy bombardment, Ney launched an assault against the Russians, crossing the Stragan but failing to capture the crest. Murat's cavalry attacks were bogged down in marshy ground and accomplished nothing. General Junot's force was close to the battlefield and was urged to attack the Russians by Murat. Junot did not engage, and the opportunity for a decisive victory passed.

A few hours later, Ney launched the last French attack. General Gudin led the assault and was hit by a cannonball, which removed one leg. He died three days later from infection. The French managed to capture the crest after hard fighting. By that point the majority of Barclay's army had escaped and was heading towards Lubino.

Aftermath
The French suffered around 7,000-8,800 casualties. The Russians lost about 6,000. Napoleon was furious after the battle, realizing that another good chance to trap and destroy the Russian army had been lost.

See also
List of battles of the French invasion of Russia

Notes

References

External links
 

Conflicts in 1812
Battles of the Napoleonic Wars
Battles involving Russia
1812 in France
History of Smolensk Oblast
August 1812 events
Battles of the French invasion of Russia
Battles inscribed on the Arc de Triomphe